P. rex may refer to:

 Papilio rex, the regal swallowtail, a butterfly species found in Africa
 Pedicularis rex, a plant related to lousewort
 Percina rex, the Roanoke logperch, a small freshwater fish species found in the Roanoke and Chowan drainages
 Pseudoeurycea rex, a salamander species found mostly in Guatemala and Mexico

See also
 Rex (disambiguation)